"Into Your System" is a song written and produced by Peter Hartmann and Jan Langhoff and recorded by the Dutch singer EliZe. The song was the fourth single released from EliZe's first album, In Control (2006). The single entered the Dutch Top 40 at number 33 and peaked at number 18 in its fourth week.

Track listing
CD single
"Into Your System" [radio version] – 3:05
"Into Your System" [extended version] – 6:14
"Into Your System" [enhanced video] – 3:05

Music video 

The music video of "Into Your System" is directed by Peter van Eyndt and features EliZe in several settings, amongst which a scene with diamonds all over her body and a scene with a yellow python.

Charts

References

EliZe songs
2006 singles
2006 songs